The term melee has been adopted and popularized in wargaming, table top, and video games to encompass all forms of close combat. This can include any combat that involves directly striking an opponent at ranges generally less than a metre, especially using martial arts or melee weapons. This term is especially used in comparison to other strategies, such as ranged combat or magic (where applicable) when the game offers multiple methods of combat.

History
The early tabletop war game, Kriegsspiel, created in 1812, contained rules for a "hand-fight" or hand-to-hand combat. In some translations, this stage of the game was referred to in passing as a melée. 

H.G. Wells' 1913 Little Wars was the first to specifically outline a "melee" rule in his eponymous war game. Many later wargames (and video games) can trace their origins to the rulesets first laid out in Little Wars.

In 1968, Gary Gygax and Jeff Perren adopted and modified the rules for Siege of Bodenburg, a medieval war game, and expanded on rules for one-on-one melee combat and specific melee weapon rules. This modified ruleset was published as Chainmail and included a fantasy supplement which would later be known as Dungeons & Dragons. The popularity of Dungeons & Dragons, which featured a "melee phase" to represent the fighting of characters outside of bows and magic, would help spread the use of "melee" as a phrase for other table-top and video games.

In video games
This term still applies to most role-playing games, but is often used in the context of first-person shooter video games to specify a non-ranged attack. This began with the 1992 game Wolfenstein 3D, which featured a knife that could be selected from the inventory, just like a gun. Because of the risk involved in using a melee weapon, they were typically the most powerful weapons available, in terms of damage. Later, Duke Nukem 3D would include a button that allowed the character to kick enemies while still wielding a gun. A Nintendo fighting game franchise called Super Smash Bros. had its second game released in 2001 for the GameCube and used the term "melee" in the title.

In strategy games, especially real-time strategy, infantry units that do not use ranged weapons are often called melee units.

References

See also
Melee weapon
Melee (warfare)

Gaming